The 2012 British Academy Television Awards (formally known as the Arqiva British Academy Television Awards) were held on 27 May 2012 at the Royal Festival Hall in London.
The nominees were announced on 24 April 2012.

Winners and nominees
Winners are listed first and highlighted in boldface.

Leading Actor
Dominic West - Appropriate Adult (ITV)
Benedict Cumberbatch - Sherlock (BBC One)
Joseph Gilgun - This Is England '88 (Channel 4)
John Simm - Exile (BBC One)

Leading Actress
Emily Watson - Appropriate Adult (ITV)
Romola Garai - The Crimson Petal and the White (BBC Two)
Nadine Marshall - Random (Channel 4)
Vicky McClure - This Is England '88 (Channel 4)

Supporting Actor
Andrew Scott - Sherlock (BBC One)
Martin Freeman - Sherlock (BBC One)
Joseph Mawle - Birdsong (BBC One)
Stephen Rea - The Shadow Line (BBC Two)

Supporting Actress
Monica Dolan - Appropriate Adult (ITV)
Anna Chancellor - The Hour (BBC Two)
Miranda Hart - Call the Midwife (BBC One)
Maggie Smith - Downton Abbey (ITV)

Entertainment Performance
Graham Norton - The Graham Norton Show (BBC One)
Alan Carr - Alan Carr: Chatty Man (Channel 4)
Harry Hill - Harry Hill's TV Burp (ITV)
Dara Ó Briain - Mock the Week (BBC Two)

Female Performance in a Comedy Programme
Jennifer Saunders - Absolutely Fabulous (BBC One)
Olivia Colman - Twenty Twelve (BBC Four)
Tamsin Greig - Friday Night Dinner (Channel 4)
Ruth Jones - Stella (Sky One)

Male Performance in a Comedy Programme
Darren Boyd - Spy (Sky One)
Hugh Bonneville - Twenty Twelve (BBC Four)
Tom Hollander - Rev. (BBC Two)
Brendan O'Carroll -  Mrs. Brown's Boys  (BBC One)

Single Drama
Random (Channel 4)
Holy Flying Circus (BBC Four)
Page Eight (BBC Two)
Stolen (BBC One)

Mini Series
This Is England '88 (Channel 4)
Appropriate Adult (ITV)
The Crimson Petal and the White (BBC Two)
Top Boy (Channel 4)

Drama Series
The Fades (BBC Three)
Misfits (E4)
Scott and Bailey (ITV)
Spooks (MI-5) (BBC)

Soap and Continuing Drama
Coronation Street (ITV)
EastEnders (BBC One)
Holby City (BBC One)
Shameless (Channel 4)

International
Borgen (BBC Four)
The Killing (BBC Four)
Modern Family (Sky One)
The Slap (BBC Four)

Factual Series
Our War (BBC Three)
The Choir: Military Wives (BBC Two)
Educating Essex (Channel 4)
Protecting Our Children: Damned If We Do, Damned If We Don't (BBC Two)

Specialist Factual
Mummifying Alan: Egypt’s Last Secret (Channel 4)
British Masters (BBC Four)
Frozen Planet (BBC One)
Wonders of the Universe (BBC Two)

Single Documentary
Terry Pratchett: Choosing to Die (BBC Two)
9/11: The Day That Changed the World (ITV)
The Fight of Their Lives (ITV)
We Need To Talk About Dad (Channel 4)

Features
The Great British Bake Off (BBC Two)
DIY SOS: The Big Build (BBC One)
Hairy Bikers' Meals on Wheels (BBC Two)
Timothy Spall: Back at Sea (BBC Four)

Reality and Constructed Factual
Young Apprentice (BBC One)
An Idiot Abroad (Sky One)
Don't Tell the Bride (BBC Three)
Made in Chelsea (E4)

Current Affairs
Undercover Care: The Abuse Exposed (BBC One)
Bahrain: Shouting in the Dark (Al Jazeera English)
Sri Lanka's Killing Fields (Channel 4)
The Truth About Adoption (BBC One)

News Coverage
Channel 4 News: Japan Earthquake (Channel 4)
BBC News at Ten: Siege of Homs (BBC One)
ITV News at Ten: Battle of Misrata (ITV)
Sky News: Libya Rebel Convoy – Live (Sky News)

Sport and Live Event
The Royal Wedding (BBC One)
Frankenstein's Wedding: Live in Leeds (BBC Three)
2011 Rugby World Cup Final (ITV)
2011 Tour de France (ITV4)

New Media
Psychoville (BBC Online)
Autumnwatch (BBC Online)
The Bank Job (Channel4.com)
Misfits (E4.com)

Entertainment Programme
Derren Brown: The Experiments (Channel 4)
Celebrity Juice (ITV2)
Harry Hill's TV Burp (ITV)
Michael McIntyre’s Christmas Comedy Roadshow (BBC One)

Comedy Programme
Stewart Lee's Comedy Vehicle (BBC Two)
Charlie Brooker’s 2011 Wipe (BBC Four)
Comic Strip: The Hunt for Tony Blair (Channel 4)
The Cricklewood Greats (BBC Four)

Situation Comedy
Mrs. Brown's Boys (BBC One)
Fresh Meat (Channel 4)
Friday Night Dinner (Channel 4)
Rev (BBC Two)

YouTube Audience Award
Celebrity Juice (ITV2)
Educating Essex (Channel 4)
Fresh Meat (Channel 4)
Frozen Planet (BBC One)
Sherlock (BBC One)
The Great British Bake Off (BBC Two)

Fellowship
Rolf Harris

Special Award
Steven Moffat

See also
 2012 British Academy Television Craft Awards
 2012 British Academy Scotland Awards
 2012 British Academy Cymru Awards

References
 
http://www.bafta.org/television/awards/nominees-winner-2012,3256,BA.html

External links
Official site at BAFTA.org

2012 awards in the United Kingdom
2012 in British television
British Academy Television Awards, 2012
Annual television shows
Television
May 2012 events in the United Kingdom
Royal Festival Hall